A Game of Death is a 1945 American adventure film directed by Robert Wise. It is a remake of Richard Connell's 1924 short story "The Most Dangerous Game", about a madman who hunts human prey on his personal island habitat. It stars John Loder and Audrey Long. In the original story and 1932 movie, the madman is a Russian. In this version the madman is a German.

Cast
John Loder as Don Rainsford
Audrey Long as Ellen Trowbridge
Edgar Barrier as Erich Kreiger
Russell Wade as Robert Trowbridge
Russell Hicks as Mr. Whitney
Jason Robards Sr. as The Captain
Noble Johnson as Carib
Edmund Glover as Quartermaster (uncredited)

Production
The film was originally called The Most Dangerous Game. Audrey Long was signed in January 1945. Edgar Garrier joined shortly afterwards. The movie used out-takes from RKO's 1932 production of "The Most Dangerous Game" with Joel McCrea and Fay Wray.

References

External links

Review of film at Variety

1945 films
1945 adventure films
American black-and-white films
1940s English-language films
Films based on short fiction
Films directed by Robert Wise
Films about hunters
Films set on fictional islands
RKO Pictures films
Films about death games
Films based on thriller novels
American adventure films
Films scored by Paul Sawtell
1940s American films